Umuogele Ntigha is one of the villages that make up the Avoh Na Ogele autonomous community of Ntigha, Abia State, Nigeria.

See also 
 List of villages in Abia State

References 

Populated places in Abia State